Evgeny Mikhailovich Rylov (born 23 September 1996) is a Russian competitive swimmer and Olympic champion specializing in backstroke events. He won three gold medals at the 2014 Summer Youth Olympics in Nanjing, and a bronze medal at his senior international debut at the 2015 World Championships in Kazan. He also won a bronze medal at the 2016 Summer Olympics in Rio de Janeiro and a gold medal at the 2017 World Championships in Budapest, both were in the 200 metre backstroke event. In 2018, at the 2018 World Short Course Championships, he won gold medals in the 200 metre backstroke and 50 metre backstroke. At the 2019 World Championships, he won a gold medal in the 200 metre backstroke, silver medal in the 100 metre backstroke, and silver medal in the 50 metre backstroke. He won the gold medal in the 100 metre backstroke and 200 metre backstroke at the 2020 Summer Olympics in Tokyo.

Background
Rylov's father Mikhail Rylov is a former footballer, who now serves as a coach. In childhood he tried playing association football, but chose instead swimming. He is a staff police sergeant of the Moscow Oblast Police of the town district of Lobnya.

Career

2014 Summer Youth Olympics
Rylov first established himself on the world scene at the 2014 Summer Youth Olympics in Nanjing, China, where he achieved a total of four medals, three golds and one silver, and broke two world junior records. In the 100 metre backstroke, Rylov shared the top prize with Italy's Simone Sabbioni in a matching time of 54.24 seconds. On 20 August, he put up a sterling effort of 25.09 seconds to crush the world junior record and pick up his second gold of the meet in the 50 metre backstroke, touching out Greece's Apostolos Christou by 0.35 of a second. Less than an hour later, Rylov and his teammates Anton Chupkov, Aleksandr Sadovnikov, and Filipp Shopin led throughout the race to capture the  medley relay title in a world junior record-breaking time of 3:38.02. On the final night of the Games, Rylov added a silver to his medal tally, this time in the 200 metre backstroke with a time of 1:57.08, losing the title and his chance of breaking another record to China's Li Guangyuan by 14-hundredths of a second. Additionally, he helped achieve a fourth-place finish in the 4×100 metre mixed freestyle relay on the first day of competition in 3:32.15 and a fourth-place finish on the third day of competition in the 4×100 metre freestyle relay in 3:25.01.

2015 World Championships

When Russia hosted the 2015 World Aquatics Championships in Kazan, Rylov charged his way to round out the podium with a third-place and Russian record time of 1:54.60 in the 200 metre backstroke. Earlier in the Championships, he posted a time of 53.23 seconds to place seventh in the final of the 100 metre backstroke, finishing 0.57 seconds behind the bronze medalist in the event Matt Grevers of the United States. He also placed fifth in the 4×100 metre medley relay, contributing a split of 53.21 seconds for the backstroke leg to help achieve a finals relay time of 3:30.90.

2016 Summer Olympics

At the Russian Championships in April 2016, Rylov broke the European record in the 200 metre backstroke with a time of 1:54.21. Approximately four months later, at the 2016 Summer Olympics in Rio de Janeiro, Brazil, he broke the European record again with a time of 1:53.97 and won the bronze medal in the 200 metre backstroke. In the 100 metre backstroke, he placed sixth in the final with a time of 52.74 seconds. For the 4×100 metre medley relay, he split a 52.90 for the backstroke leg of the relay to help achieve a fourth-place finish in 3:31.30 with finals relay teammates Anton Chupkov (breaststroke), Aleksandr Sadovnikov (butterfly), and Vladimir Morozov (freestyle).

2017
At 2017 Russian Championships in April, he lowered his own 200 metre backstroke European record for the third time with a time of 1:53.81 before tying the Russian record in the 50 metre backstroke with a time of 24.52 seconds less than one hour later.

2017 World Championships

At the World Aquatics Championships, held in July 2017 at Danube Arena in Budapest, Hungary, Rylov broke his own European record once again in the 200 metre backstroke with a time of 1:53.61, winning the gold medal and defeating the silver medalist in the event, and 2016 Olympic champion in the event, Ryan Murphy of the United States by 0.60 seconds in the process. This was the first long course world championships gold medal won by a Russian male swimmer in an individual event since 2003. For the 4×100 metre medley relay on the final day of swimming competition, he split a 52.89 for the backstroke leg of the relay in the final to contribute to a bronze medal-win in a Russian record time of 3:29.76 with finals relay teammates Kirill Prigoda (breaststroke), Aleksandr Popkov (butterfly), and Vladimir Morozov (freestyle).

2018

2018 European Championships
At the 2018 European Aquatics Championships in Glasgow, Scotland in August, Rylov won the gold medal in the 200 metre backstroke with a European record and Championships record time of 1:53.36. He won his first gold medal of the Championships five days earlier in the 4×100 metre freestyle relay, leading-off the relay in 48.62 seconds to help finish first in 3:12.23. For the 100 metre backstroke, he won the silver medal with a time of 52.74 seconds in the final, finishing 0.21 seconds behind gold medalist in the event Kliment Kolesnikov, also of Russia. In the 4×100 metre medley relay, he swam a 52.66 for the backstroke portion of the relay in the preliminary heats before being substituted out for Kliment Kolesnikov in the final and winning a silver medal for his efforts when the finals relay finished second in 3:32.03.

2018 World Short Course Championships

On the first day of competition at the 2018 World Short Course Swimming Championships in Hangzhou, China in December, Rylov won a silver medal in the 4×100 metre freestyle relay, swimming a 46.09 for the lead-off leg of the relay in the prelims heats before being substituted out for Vladislav Grinev in the final, where the finals relay placed second with a 3:03.11. The second day, he won a bronze medal as part of the 4×50 metre mixed freestyle relay, contributing a lead-off split time of 21.21 seconds in the prelims heats to help qualify the relay to the final ranking second, where it when on to finish in third-place with a 1:28.73. In the 4×50 metre mixed medley relay the following day, he swam a 23.18 for the backstroke leg of the relay in the prelims heats, was substituted out and Kliment Kolesnikov substituted in for the finals relay, and won a bronze medal when the finals relay placed third in 1:37.33.

Day four of competition, Rylov anchored the 4×50 metre freestyle relay in the final to help achieve a silver medal victory in a new Russian record time of 1:22.22, splitting a time of 20.37 seconds, which was the third-fastest split time in the final heat behind Ryan Held of the United States, who split a 20.25, and Chad le Clos of South Africa, who split a 20.31. Later in the same session, he won the gold medal in the 50 metre backstroke with a Russian record time of 22.58 seconds. His time moved him up in rankings to the second-fastest performer in the event all-time, only behind world record holder Florent Manaudou. In the final of the 4×50 metre medley relay the following day, he swam the fastest freestyle leg in the field with a time of 20.22 seconds, helping win the gold medal with a finals relay time of 1:30.54. On the sixth and final day, he won the gold medal in the 200 metre backstroke with a time of 1:47.02, finishing 0.32 seconds ahead of the silver medalist, Ryan Murphy, and 1.23 seconds ahead of the bronze medalists, Radosław Kawęcki and Mitch Larkin.

2019

2019 World Championships

At the World Aquatics Championships in Gwangju, South Korea in July 2019, he defended the World Championships title in the 200 metre backstroke. He also won silver medals in the 50 metre backstroke, finishing 0.06 seconds behind gold medalist Zane Waddell of South Africa with a 24.49, and the 100 metre backstroke, where he swam a 52.67 to finish 24-hundredths of a second behind gold medalist Xu Jiayu of China. With his three individual medals, he became the first male swimmer to win a medal in all three backstroke distances at a single World Aquatics Championships. In the final of the 4×100 metre freestyle relay, he swam the second-fastest split in the field with a 47.02 for the anchor leg of the relay, which was just four-hundredths of a second faster than the 47.06 swum by third-fastest Kyle Chalmers of Australia and sixteen-hundredths of a second slower than the 46.86 swum by Zach Apple of the United States, and contributed to a silver medal-winning finish in 3:09.97. For the 4×100 metre mixed medley relay, Rylov swam the backstroke leg of the relay in the final, helping achieve a fourth-place finish in a Russian record time of 3:40.78 with a split of 51.97 seconds. His time of 51.97 seconds for the lead-off leg of the relay was faster than the Russian record of 52.44 seconds he set in the semifinals of the 100 metre backstroke, however it did not count as a new record as times from mixed gender events do not count for individual gender records. As part of the 4×100 metre medley relay, he split the fastest backstroke leg in the final with a 52.57 to help win the bronze medal in a Russian record time of 3:28.81.

2019 International Swimming League
In the Autumn of 2019, he was member of the inaugural International Swimming League swimming for the Energy Standard International Swim Club, who won the team title in Las Vegas, Nevada, in December. He won the 100 metre backtroke with aand 200 metre backstroke events at both the Budapest and London matches after winning just the 100 metre backstroke in Naples.

2021
At the 2021 Russian Championships in April, Rylov set a new 100 metre backstroke Russian record with a time of 52.12 seconds before setting a new 200 metre backstroke European record with a time of 1:53.23 three days later.

2020 European Championships
On the first day of swimming competition at the 2020 European Aquatics Championships, held in Budapest, Hungary in May, Rylov won a gold medal as part of the 4×100 metre freestyle relay, splitting 48.61 for the anchor leg of the relay in the prelims heats to help advance the relay to the final ranking fourth, where the finals relay finished first in a time of 3:10.41. The next day, he won a bronze medal in the 4×200 metre mixed freestyle relay again for his efforts in the prelims heats, this time swimming a time of 1:48.76 for the second leg of the prelims relay to help advance the relay to the final ranking sixth before the finals relay placed third in a time of 7:31.54. In the 100 metre backstroke on the third and fourth days of competition, Rylov was the highest ranking swimmer representing Russia, placing eighth overall with a time of 53.51 seconds in the final. On days five and six of competition, he competed in the 200 metre backstroke, ultimately winning the gold medal and European title with a time of 1:54.46 in the final, finishing less than two-tenths of a second ahead of silver medalist Luke Greenbank of Great Britain. The seventh and final day of competition, he won a silver medal for his prelims efforts on the 4×100 metre medley relay, helping advance the relay to the final ranking sixth with a backstroke split of 53.44 in the prelims heats before the finals relay finished second with a time of 3:29.50.

2020 Summer Olympics

At the 2020 Summer Olympics in Tokyo, Japan, held in 2021 due to the COVID-19 pandemic, he claimed gold medals in the 100 metre backstroke and 200 metre backstroke respectively, breaking the 100 metre backstroke European record with a time of 51.98 and the 200 metre backstroke Olympic record with a time of 1:53.27. He became Russia's first indoor Olympic swimming champion in 25 years.

Rylov also won a silver medal in 4×200 metre freestyle relay together with his finals relay teammates, splitting a 1:45.26 for the third leg of the relay. In addition to events he medaled in, he helped achieve a fourth-place finish in the 4×100 metre medley relay in 3:29.22 and a seventh-place finish in the 4×100 metre mixed medley relay in 3:42.45, swimming the backstroke leg of each relay in the final.

2021 International Swimming League
Rylov was the MVP of the 9th match in the regular season of ISL season 3 in 2021.

2021 European Short Course Championships
In November, at the 2021 European Short Course Swimming Championships in Kazan, Rylov won a bronze medal in the 4×50 metre freestyle relay on day one, splitting a 20.99 for the third leg of the relay to contribute to the finals relay time of 1:23.35. On the second day, he placed 20th in the preliminary heats of the 50 metre freestyle with a time of 21.61 seconds. The following day, he placed fourth in the preliminary heats of the 100 metre backstroke, not advancing to the semifinals as he was not one of the two fastest swimmers representing Russia with his time of 50.55 seconds. Day five, he ranked fourth in the semifinals of the 200 metre backstroke with a time of 1:51.73 before withdrawing from competing in the final of the event on the final day of competition.

2022
On 18 March 2022, Rylov participated in the Moscow rally in support of the Russian invasion of Ukraine. His swimwear sponsor at the time of the rally, Speedo, terminated their endorsement deal with Rylov in response to his participation in the rally. He was also subsequently suspended from the Energy Standard International Swimming Club of the International Swimming League along with all other support staff and athletes from Russia. Later in the same week, he withdrew from competing at the 2022 World Aquatics Championships and FINA announced his participation in the rally was under investigation in regards to potentially violating FINA rules. On 20 April 2022, he received a nine-month suspension by FINA "from all competitions and activities organized or sanctioned by FINA, including any International Competition on the FINA World Aquatic Calendar". Prior to this individualized ban for his participation in the rally, he was subjected to a blanket ban on 3 March 2022 by the European governing body for aquatic sports, LEN, which banned all Russian and Belarusians athletes and officials from taking part and competing at LEN competitions until further notice. While he competed at non-FINA and non-LEN events during the year, such as the Russian Championships, his times did not count for world rankings nor world records.

At the multi-country and multi-sport 2022 Russian Solidarity Games segment in November 2022, with swimming competition held in Kazan and conducted in short course metres, Rylov won the bronze medal in the 100 metre backstroke with a time of 50.03 seconds on day three of competition, 21 November. Two days later, in his first final of the day, he placed fourth in the 50 metre freestyle with a time of 21.41 seconds. Later in the same session, he won the bronze medal in the 50 metre backstroke in a time of 23.16 seconds, which was 1.05 seconds behind gold medalist Kliment Kolesnikov who swam 0.11 seconds faster than the world record in the event. On day seven of seven, he won a gold medal in the 200 metre backstroke, finishing in 1:50.32.

International championships

Long course metres (50 m pool)

 Rylov swam only in the prelims heats.

Short course metres (25 m pool)

 Rylov swam only in the prelims heats.

Career best times

Long course metres (50 m pool)

Short course metres (25 m pool)

Continental and national records

Long course metres (50 m pool)

Short course metres (25 m pool)

See also

List of multiple Olympic gold medalists at a single Games
List of Youth Olympic Games gold medalists who won Olympic gold medals
List of World Swimming Championships (25 m) medalists (men)
List of European records in swimming
Chronological summary of the 2020 Summer Olympics
World and Olympic records set at the 2020 Summer Olympics

References

External links
 
 
 
 Nanjing 2014 Profile
 Eurosport Bio

1996 births
Living people
Sports controversies
Swimming controversies
Russian male swimmers
Olympic swimmers of Russia
Swimmers at the 2016 Summer Olympics
Swimmers at the 2020 Summer Olympics
Swimmers at the 2014 Summer Youth Olympics
World Aquatics Championships medalists in swimming
Male backstroke swimmers
People from Novotroitsk
Olympic gold medalists for Russia
Olympic bronze medalists for Russia
Olympic bronze medalists in swimming
Medalists at the 2016 Summer Olympics
Medalists at the 2020 Summer Olympics
European Aquatics Championships medalists in swimming
Youth Olympic gold medalists for Russia
Russian police officers
Olympic silver medalists for Russia
Olympic silver medalists in swimming
Olympic gold medalists for the Russian Olympic Committee athletes
Olympic silver medalists for the Russian Olympic Committee athletes
Sportspeople from Orenburg Oblast